Persatuan Sepak Bola Indonesia Ngawi, commonly known as Persinga Ngawi is a semi-professional football club based in Ngawi Regency, East Java, Indonesia. The team nickname is "Laskar Alas Ketonggo". Persinga competes in Liga 3. Persinga's stadium is known as the Ketonggo Stadium. In 2013 Liga Indonesia First Division, Persinga Ngawi become runners-up in a final match 0–1 loss against PS Kwarta, this is his best achievement in the club's history.

Players

Current squad

Coaching Staff

Honours
Liga Indonesia First Division
 Runners-up (1): 2013

References

External links
 

Football clubs in Indonesia
1958 establishments in Indonesia
Football clubs in East Java
Association football clubs established in 1958